Amrud is a village located in the Darwaz area of Afghanistan, situated near the Amu Darya.

References

Populated places in Nusay District